Eric "Roscoe" Ambel (Born August 20, 1957) is a New York City–based guitarist and record producer, originally from Batavia, Illinois.

He has worked with a wide range of artists including Nils Lofgren, The Brandos, Steve Earle, the Yayhoos, Del Lords, The Bottle Rockets, Joan Jett, Mojo Nixon, Blood Oranges, Blue Mountain, Freedy Johnston and Mary Lee's Corvette.

Early life 

Eric "Roscoe" Ambel" was born August 20, 1957 in Kankakee, Illinois. At a young age, Eric took up the piano and trumpet as part of the School music program. Around 10 years old Eric borrowed a guitar from his neighbor and began to teach himself with a chord book and by playing along with records. Eric played both trumpet and guitar through his college career at University of Wyoming.

"Ambel first took up the rock 'n' roll torch in the late 1970s while attending college the University of Wyoming, where he formed the punk combo the Dirty Dogs, who released the cult-classic single "Sorority Girl" before changing their name to the Accelerators and relocating to Los Angeles. In L.A. the Accelerators recorded and released an EP called "It's Cool To Rock" produced by Danny Holloway (Plimsouls, Bob Marley). Then, after playing with Rik L Rik and Top Jimmy, he began a two-year stint as lead guitarist in Joan Jett's original Blackhearts, touring extensively and playing on her I Love Rock 'n' Roll album. He exited in the early 1980s to co-found the gritty New York foursome the Del-Lords, which also included ex-Dictator Scott Kempner and future Cracker drummer Frank Funaro, which released four highly regarded studio albums and helped usher in the 1980s roots-rock mini-boom."

Later life
"Veteran singer/guitarist/songwriter/producer/raconteur Eric Ambel—known to friends, associates and bandmates as Roscoe—is the possessor of an estimable musical resume that’s established his credentials as a deeply committed rocker as well as a witty and thoughtful songwriter. Between his current duties as producer, bandleader, studio proprietor, bar owner, member of uber-bar-band supergroup the Yayhoos and lead guitarist of Steve Earle’s band the Dukes, he’s found time to launch his own label, Lakeside Lounge Records, to redress the longstanding absence of Ambel solo product from the marketplace.

Lakeside Lounge Records’ initial release is Knucklehead, the first new Eric Ambel album in nearly a decade. The disc compiles 15 previously unreleased tracks recorded by Ambel in a variety of locations over the past 14 years with a variety of notable collaborators, including his fondly-remembered ’80s band the Del-Lords, the Bottle Rockets, Andy York (John Mellencamp), Warner Hodges (Jason and the Scorchers), Will Rigby (the dB’s), Tony Maimone (Pere Ubu), Tony Shanahan (Patti Smith), Ron Gremp (the Morells), Steven Terry (Whiskeytown), Martin’s Folly and Ambel’s Yayhoos cohorts Dan Baird, Keith Christopher and Terry Anderson. Also lending a hand is Steve Earle, who contributes a previously unheard composition, "The Usual Time", and adds vocals to a new version of the Del-Lords chestnut "Judas Kiss".

In 1996, Ambel co-founded the Yayhoos with ex-Georgia Satellites frontman Dan Baird, Satellites/Shaver/Roscoe's Gang bassist Keith Christopher and noted drummer/tunesmith Terry Anderson, who released their long-brewing debut album Fear Not the Obvious on Bloodshot Records in 2001. Also in 1996, Ambel opened the popular East Village bar the Lakeside Lounge, which he co-owns and where he sometimes performs. In 1999, he inaugurated Cowboy Technical Services, his own 24-track analog/digital recording studio in Williamsburg, Brooklyn, which has since played host to the likes of Ryan Adams, Robert Randolph, Steve Wynn, Marshall Crenshaw, Laura Cantrell, Marah, the Silos, the Damnwells and Martin's Folly.

In 2000, he became lead guitarist in Steve Earle’s touring and recording band the Dukes, appearing on such projects as Earle’s acclaimed Jerusalem album, the documentary profile Just An American Boy]] and the Grammy Award winning record The Revolution Starts…..Now.  Ambel recorded and toured with Earle and the Dukes from 2000 through 2005.

In June 2006 Ambel’s Lakeside Lounge label releases the new Yayhoos cd titled Put The Hammer Down  Also in 2006 Ambel's song "Baby I Love You" from the Yayhoos Fear Not the Obvious was featured as the closing credits song in James Gunn's Horror/Comedy film SLiTHER.

Ambel has been producing records for many artists including Kasey Anderson, The Travelling Band, Mark McKay and the Bottle Rockets while playing gigs with the Roscoe Trio and playing guitar for Mike Ferrio's band Tandy.

In 2008 New West Records released the Steve Earle Live From Austin, TX from the Austin City Limits November 12, 2000 show featuring Eric as a member of the Dukes.

In 2009 The Bottle Rockets Ambel produced Lean Forward was released by Bloodshot Records.  Ambel also began work on his Gringoman recordings which find him playing all the instruments and doing most of the recording in his home studio Lily’s Terrace in the East Village.

In 2010 the Del-Lords released the Ambel produced Under Construction'' EP.  The recent reissues of their records had brought them back together.  After a couple undercover warm-up gigs in the North East the band played their first tour in 20 years in Spain.  Back in NYC Ambel began work on Chris Barron’s next solo record and albums from Ben Hall from Nashville and the Tallboys of Kentucky."

Awards & Contribution

Currently 
In the past ten years Eric has been involved with producing records and playing with bands in New York City.
As a member of Yayhoos with Dan Baird, Keith Christopher and Terry Anderson, the band put out the record “Put The Hammer Down” in 2006.  In the 1980s Del-Lords reformed and put out a record titled “Elvis Club” in 2013. After 11 years, Eric put out his first solo record titled “Lakeside” after a bar he co-owned. He also runs Cowboy Technical Services, a recording studio, with Tim Hatfield.

Discography

References

External links 
 
 
 
 

1957 births
Living people
People from Batavia, Illinois
Record producers from Illinois
The Del-Lords members
People from Kankakee, Illinois
The Brandos members